Beau Séjour (the first season is internationally known as Hotel Beau Séjour) is a Flemish-language Belgian supernatural crime drama television series created by Bert Van Dael and Sanne Nuyens, and directed by Nathalie Basteyns and Kaat Beels. It began airing on the Belgian channel Eén on 1 January 2017 and on Arte in France, Germany, and French-speaking Belgium on 2 March. It debuted on Netflix in some countries on 16 March 2017..

A second season was confirmed for the series in November 2017, and filming began in 2019. It premiered on Eén on 31 January 2021.

Synopsis
First season: In the Belgian village of Lanklaar in Limburg, near the Dutch border, teenager Kato Hoeven awakes at the small Hotel Beau Séjour to find a bloody corpse in the bathtub—her own. She has no memory of the day before her death or why she was there. She soon discovers that a select few people are able to see her and communicate with her as she desperately tries to find out who was responsible for her murder and why they killed her.

Second season: Maurice, a Belgian Naval officer, awakes in the middle of a huge storm to discover his own dead body hanging from a mast on his sailboat, Beau Séjour, off the coast of Zeebrugge. Refusing to believe he hanged himself, he must solve his own murder.

Cast and characters

Season 1

 Lynn Van Royen as Kato Hoeven, teenage murder victim
 Kris Cuppens as Luc Hoeven, Kato's father
 Charlotte Timmers as Sofia Otten, Kato's 18-year-old stepsister
 Joke Emmers as Ines Anthoni, Kato's friend
 Johan van Assche as Alexander Vinken, local 'crooked' cop
 Joren Seldeslachts as Charlie Vinken, Alexander's son
 Inge Paulussen as Kristel Brouwers, Kato's mother
 Jan Hammenecker as Marcus Otten, Kristel's husband and Kato's stepfather
 Guus Bullen as Cyril Otten, Kato's 12-years-old stepbrother
 Reinhilde Decleir as Renee Brouwers, Kato's maternal grandmother
 Roel Vanderstukken as Bart Blom, local police officer and Alexander's partner
 Katrin Lohmann as Marion Schneider, federal police detective; lead investigator into Kato's death
 Mieke de Groote as Dora Plettinckx, federal police detective
 Tiny Bertels as Hild Jacobs, Alexander's wife and Charlie's mother
 Maarten Nulens as Leon Vinken, Kato's boyfriend, Charlie's cousin, a motocross racer
 Barbara Sarafian as Melanie Engelenhof, Leon's mother, Alexander's widowed sister-in-law, owner of the Hotel Beau Séjour

Season 2

 Gene Bervoets as Maurice Teirlinck, former marine commander
 Katelijne Verbeke as Bea Teirlinck, Maurice's ex-wife
 Emilie De Roo as Esther Teirlinck, Maurice's oldest daughter
 Lize Feryn as Alice Teirlinck, Maurice's youngest daughter
 Greet Verstraete as Britt Teirlinck, Maurice's middle daughter
 Lennard Corne as Jasper Greeve, Maurice's grandson (Britt's son)
 Titus De Voogdt as Vinnie Scheepers, local police officer and friend of the Teirlinck family; former federal police detective
 Janne Desmet as Mira Declerck, federal police detective; lead investigator into Maurice's death
 Hilde Uitterlinden as Micheline "Bobonne" Teirlinck, Maurice's mother
 Tom Vermeir as Joachim Claes, Esther's husband
 Sam Louwyck as Guy Greeve, Jasper's other grandfather
 Alessia Sartor as Lola Claes, Maurice's granddaughter, daughter of Esther and Joachim
 Lennert Lefever as Simon Claes, Maurice's grandson, son of Esther and Joachim
 Kasper Vandenberghe as Erik Greeve, Jasper's deceased father, Britt's deceased husband
 Jack Wouterse as Tille Vanderwal, Bea's boyfriend
 Charlie Chan Dagelet as Yasmine Amani, Alice's (girl)friend
 Louis Talpe as Nicholas Moens, Vinnie's boyfriend

Episodes

Season 1 (2017)

Season 2 (2021)
{{Episode table |background = #255E78 |overall =5 |season =5 |title =17 |alttitle = |director =11|writer =50|airdate = |viewers=9 |country=Belgium |total_width=100 |episodes=

{{Episode list
| EpisodeNumber   = 18
| EpisodeNumber2  = 8
| Title           = The Deception
| AltTitle = Het Bedrog'
| DirectedBy      =  Nathalie Basteyns & Kaat Beels
| WrittenBy       =  Sanne Nuyens, Roel Mondelaers, Bert Van Dael
| OriginalAirDate =  
| Viewers         = –
| ShortSummary    =
| LineColor       = #255E78
}}

}}

Production
The series' first season was shot on location at the real Hotel Beau Séjour ("Nice Stay") in Dilsen-Stokkem. The father of series co-creator Nathalie Basteyns stayed at the hotel ten years before the show was created, and it made an impression upon him. Basteyns and Kaat Beels conceived the idea for the series immediately after this, when the child murders of serial killer Marc Dutroux were still fresh in people's minds. They elected to add a supernatural element to the story to set it apart from other similar neo-noir dramas. Lynn Van Royen, who portrays teenager Kato, was 28 and pregnant with her second child during the shoot. The creators and producers hoped to make the series an anthology, with a different dead character in each season.

A second season was announced in November 2017, with Sanne Nuyens and Bert Van Dael returning as writers. For the second season, the writers received a subsidy of 25,000 euros from the Flemish Audiovisual Fund.

In February 2019, it was announced that the city of Bruges and production house De Mensen had reached an agreement to film the second season in the village of Zeebrugge, a port on the coast of Belgium. Filming began in summer 2019, with Gene Bervoets cast in a leading role. The second season featured a fresh cast and storyline, albeit with a similar premise, of a murder victim trying to solve their own death. In December 2019, it was reported that Bervoets was injured during filming. He was treated at the hospital and released the same day.

Reception
The first season of Hotel Beau Séjour was well received by critics, with particular praise for Lynn Van Royen's portrayal of the murdered Kato. John Doyle of The Globe and Mail compared it favorably to the first season of HBO's True Detective, calling it "a remarkably textured, slow-burning and compelling murder mystery." The Los Angeles Times called Hotel Beau Séjour a "worthy new addition to a crowded streaming field of moody European crime thrillers."

American horror master Stephen King praised the series on Twitter, calling Hotel Beau Séjour "Eccentric, brilliant, and strangely touching. Supernatural fare for those who don't ordinarily like it."

See also
 The Rising''

References

External links
 
  at Eén
 Production website

2017 Belgian television series debuts
Flemish television shows
Belgian crime television series
Television series set in hotels
Television shows set in Belgium
Serial drama television series
Police procedural television series
Neo-noir television series
Ghosts in television
Supernatural television series
Eén original programming